Sulzbach is a municipality in the Main-Taunus district, in Hesse, Germany and part of the Frankfurt Rhein-Main urban area.

History
Sulzbach is first referred to in 1035. It was one of only a few Holy Roman Empire Imperial Villages and one of the five final ones when the Holy Roman Empire was dissolved in 1804.

The physician Philipp Jakob Cretzschmar (1786–1845) was born in Sulzbach.

Town Partnerships 
Sulzbach is twinned with
  Pont-Sainte-Maxence in France since 1982
  Jablonec nad Jizerou (dt.: Jablonetz) in the Czech Republic since 1987
  Schönheide im Erzgebirge in Saxony since 1990

Points of interest
 Arboretum Main-Taunus

References

External links 

  

Municipalities in Hesse
Main-Taunus-Kreis
Imperial Villages